Aiman Saleh Al-Hagri, commonly known as Aiman Al-Hagri (born 3 February 1993), is a Yemeni professional footballer who plays as an attacking midfielder. He represented Yemen national football team and last played for Muaither SC in the Qatari Second Division.

Club career

Al-Hagri began his professional career in Yemeni League side Shaab Ibb SCC in 2008. He scored 16 league goals for this side before moving to Persian Gulf Pro League side Tractor Sazi in 2011.

On 30 July 2013, he signed a six-months contract with Oman Professional League club Al-Shabab club.

He has also played for Bahraini clubs Al-Najma and Al Riffa, Omani side Al-Shabab, Prince Mohammad bin Salman League outfit Al-Nojoom, Indian side Shillong Lajong FC, Qatari Second Division club Muaither SC. With Al Riffa, he won the 2013–14 Bahrain Professional League and 2013–14 Bahrain FA Cup.

In 2017, he signed with I-League side Shillong Lajong FC and debuted for the club against Gokulam Kerala FC on 27 November in a 1–0 win match. He appeared in 11 league matches for the Meghalaya-based side.

International career
Al-Hagri represented Yemen's U-20 and U-23 sides from 2011 to 2014.

On 7 August 2011, he debuted for Yemen national football team against Jordan. He appeared in 25 international matches for his country, scoring 3 goals.

International goals
Scores and results list Yemen's goal tally first.

Honours

Club
Al-Sha'ab Ibb
 Yemeni League: 2011–12
Al-Riffa
 Bahraini Premier League: 2013–14
 Bahraini FA Cup: 2013–14

See also
 List of Yemeni expatriate footballers

References

External links

Player Info at Goalzz.com

1993 births
Living people
Yemeni footballers
Yemen international footballers
Yemeni expatriate footballers
Yemeni expatriate sportspeople in Iran
Yemeni expatriate sportspeople in Bahrain
Yemeni expatriate sportspeople in Oman
Yemeni expatriate sportspeople in Saudi Arabia
Yemeni expatriate sportspeople in India
Yemeni expatriate sportspeople in Qatar
Expatriate footballers in Iran
Expatriate footballers in Bahrain
Expatriate footballers in Oman
Expatriate footballers in Saudi Arabia
Expatriate footballers in India
Expatriate footballers in Qatar
Al Sha'ab Ibb players
Tractor S.C. players
Al-Najma SC (Bahrain) players
Al-Shabab SC (Seeb) players
Riffa SC players
Al-Nojoom FC players
Shillong Lajong FC players
Muaither SC players
Yemeni League players
Persian Gulf Pro League players
Bahraini Premier League players
Oman Professional League players
Saudi First Division League players
I-League players
Qatari Second Division players
Association football midfielders